Seifu Tura Abdiwak (born ) is an Ethiopian long-distance runner. He won the 2021 Chicago Marathon and placed second at the 2022 Chicago Marathon.

Career
Seifu Tura originally specialized in middle-distance running, having won the 3000 m event of the 2015 Janusz Kusociński Memorial in Szczecin, Poland, with a time of 7:56.22.

In 2017, he debuted over the marathon distance at the JoongAng Seoul Marathon, taking second place with a time of 2:09:26.

After achieving a time of 2:04:44 at the 2018 Dubai Marathon, Tura won the 2018 Milano Marathon with a time of 2:09:04, despite having an issue with cramps.  It was the runner's third attempt at the distance, six months after the first. Later that year, Tura also won the Shanghai Marathon, with a time of 2:09:18, a split second ahead of compatriot Tsegaye Mekonnen.  This also marked the first time both winners of the Shanghai Marathon were from Ethiopia, as Yebrgual Melese had also won the race, setting a course record in the process.

In 2021, Tura set a marathon personal best of 2:04:29 with a fourth-place finish in Milano.  Months later, he won the 2021 Chicago Marathon with a time of 2:06:12.

The following year in July, Tura placed sixth in the marathon at the 2022 World Championships in Eugene, Oregon with a time of 2:07:17. He finished second at the 2022 Chicago Marathon in October in 2:04:49.

Personal bests
 3000 metres – 7:52.04 (Madrid 2015)
 5000 metres – 13:27.70 (Barcelona 2015)
 10 kilometres – 29:05 (Addis Ababa 2016)
 Half marathon – 58:36 (Ras Al Khaimah 2022)
 Marathon – 2:04:29 (Milan 2021)

Notes

References

External links 
 
 

1997 births
Living people
Ethiopian male middle-distance runners
Ethiopian male long-distance runners
Ethiopian male marathon runners
Chicago Marathon male winners
20th-century Ethiopian people
21st-century Ethiopian people